William Booth (born 19 September 1944) is an Australian boxer. He competed in the men's bantamweight event at the 1964 Summer Olympics. At the 1964 Summer Olympics, he lost in his first fight to Fermin Espinosa of Cuba in the Round of 32.

References

External links
 

1944 births
Living people
Australian male boxers
Olympic boxers of Australia
Boxers at the 1964 Summer Olympics
Place of birth missing (living people)
Bantamweight boxers